Reynold Dash Ruffins (August 5, 1930– July 11, 2021) was an American painter, illustrator, and graphic designer. With Milton Glaser, Edward Sorel, and Seymour Chwast, Ruffins founded Push Pin Studios in 1954. An illustrator of more than twenty children's books, Ruffins is known for his "stylistic versatility, vibrant colors, and penchant for fanciful creatures." He has had many solo exhibitions and been part of group show exhibitions at Paris' Musée du Louvre, and in Milan, Bologna, and Tokyo.

Biography 
Ruffins attended the High School of Music & Art in New York City and Cooper Union. While still a student at Cooper Union he, Seymour Chwast, Milton Glaser, and Edward Sorel, formed Design Plus, a short-lived studio. After graduation the collaborative partnership evolved and in 1954, he co-founded Push Pin Studios with fellow Cooper graduates Glaser, Sorel, and Chwast. In 1963, after leaving Push Pin, Ruffins founded another design studio with Simms Taback, a partnership which lasted for more than thirty years. Commercial clients included IBM, AT&T, Coca-Cola, CBS, Pfizer, the New York Times, Time Life, Fortune, Gourmet Magazine, and the U.S. Post Office.

Ruffins entered the field of children's book illustration in 1969, and throughout the 1970s and early 1980s he frequently collaborated with writer Jane Sarnoff.

In 1991, Ruffins teamed with Whoopi Goldberg and Herbie Hancock to produce "Koi and the Kola Nuts," a highly praised video for children which was part of Rabbit Ears Productions' We All Have Tales series.

Ruffins died peacefully at home on Sunday July 11, 2021, surrounded by family. He lived in Sag Harbor, New York; his wife Joan died in 2013.

Teaching 
A professor emeritus at CUNY's Queens College, Ruffins has also taught at the School of Visual Arts, Parsons The New School for Design, and was a visiting adjunct professor at Syracuse University.

Awards 
Ruffins was the recipient of the Augustus St. Gaudens Award (presented by Cooper Union) for outstanding professional achievement in the arts. The Cooper Union Presidential Citation was also presented to Ruffins for his work and prominence in his profession. Ruffins' work led to awards from the New York Art Directors Club and a Silver Medal from the Society of Illustrators. Ruffins won the Coretta Scott King Illustrator Honor Award in 1997 for the book Running the Road to ABC (written by Denize Lauture). His illustrations for the Haitian author earned Mr. Ruffins international honors.

Bibliography 
As illustrator, unless otherwise noted:
 The Amazing Maze (E.P. Dutton, 1969) — written by Harry Hartwick (co-illustrated with Simms Taback)
 Camels: Ships of the Desert (HarperCollins, 1974) — written by John Frederick Waters
 The Chess Book (Scribner, 1973) — written by Jane Sarnoff
 The Monster Riddle Book (Scribner 1975) — written by Jane Sarnoff
 The Code & Cipher Book (MacMillan, 1975) — written by Jane Sarnoff
 Space (Scribner, 1978) — written by Jane Sarnoff
 My Brother Never Feeds the Cat (Scribner, 1979) — writer and illustrator
 Misoso: Once Upon a Time Tales from Africa (Knopf, 1994) — written by Verna Aardema
 Running the Road to ABC (Simon & Schuster, 1996) — written by Denize Lauture
 Everywhere Faces Everywhere (Simon & Schuster, 1997) — written by James Berry
 There Was an Old Lady Who Swallowed a Trout! (Henry Holt, 1998) — written by Teri Sloat
 The Gift of the Crocodile: A Cinderella Story  (Simon & Schuster, 2000) — written by Judy Sierra
 Marco's Run (Green Light Readers, 2001) — written by Wesley Cartier
 A Friend for King Amadou (Houghton Mifflin, 2006) — written by Robert McKissack

Notes

References 
 Chwast, Seymour, The Push Pin Graphic (Chronicle Books, 2004) 
 Meggs, Phillip. A History of Graphic Design (NY: Van Nostrand Reinhold, 1983) 
 Patton, Sharon F. African American Art (Oxford University Press, 1998) 
 Pitz, Henry Clarence. 200 Years of American Illustration (NY: Random House, 1977)

External links 

 

1930 births
2021 deaths
20th-century American painters
American male painters
21st-century American painters
American magazine illustrators
African-American graphic designers
African-American illustrators
American children's book illustrators
Painters from New York City
People from Sag Harbor, New York
The High School of Music & Art alumni
Cooper Union alumni
Sag Harbor Hills, Azurest, and Ninevah Beach Subdivisions Historic District
African-American painters
21st-century African-American artists